Paul Vosburgh is an American football coach.  He is the head football coach at St. John Fisher College of Rochester, New York, a position that he has held since 1991. Vosburgh served as the head football coach at his alma mater, William Penn University, from 1985 to 1987.

Head coaching record

College

References

External links
 St. John Fisher profile

Year of birth missing (living people)
Living people
American football linebackers
Emporia State Hornets football coaches
St. John Fisher Cardinals football coaches
William Penn Statesmen football coaches
High school football coaches in New York (state)